Henry Simons may refer to:

 Henry Calvert Simons (1899–1946), American economist
 Henry Simons (footballer) (1887–1956), English footballer

See also
Henry Simmons (disambiguation)